The Field Naturalists Society of South Australia Incorporated was founded in 1883 as a section of the Royal Society, and whose aims were to further the cause of the natural sciences in the colony. It was incorporated in 1959 and is still active. Membership is open to the public on application.

History
In 1880 Samuel Way, president of the Adelaide Philosophical Society, which had just recently been granted permission to use the title "Royal Society of South Australia", lamented the lack of a local equivalent of the recently formed Field Naturalists Club of Victoria for keen amateurs to further the cause of natural sciences.

The Association was formed as the "Field Naturalists' Section of the Royal Society of South Australia" (note apostrophe) on 14 November 1883, rules adopted and officers elected, many or most being members of the Royal Society: Chairman: Professor Ralph Tate; Vice-chairmen: Dr. H. T. Whittell, and Rev. (later Professor) Walter Howchin FGS.; Hon. Secretary: W. E. Pickells. The foundation committee consisted of Dr. W. L. Cleland, Dr. W. Haacke, J. G. O. Tepper, A. Molineux, W. H. Selway, jun., G. Collis, jun., H. Dean, and G. F. Hussey. Another founding member of long standing was W. H. Baker. The first outing was to the Government Farm, Belair, on 24 November 1883.

Chairmen (or presidents) of the Society
Samuel Dixon 1890,1891
Stirling Smeaton (when?)
Edwin Ashby 1899
E. Angas Johnson 1902–1904
E. H. Lock 1904–1906. Lock was a foundation member of the Society.
John McConnell Black 1906 (author of The Naturalized Flora of South Australia)
W. H. Selway 1908–1910
Dr. Robert Pulleine 1911
E. H. Lock 1912–1914
Capt S. A. White 1914 ornithologist
W. Ham 1922
J. B. Cleland 1924
Edwin Sawle Hughes 1925
W. Champion Hackett 1926–1928
H. M. Hale 1928, 1929
Ernest H. Ising 1931–1933
Rev. H. A. Gunter 1935
Prof. J. B. Cleland 1936,1937
K. W. Dunstone 1944
George Pattison 1946
Frederic J. W. Swann 1947,1948
T. R. N. Lothian 1949–1951

The Society claims to have been instrumental in establishing
The Society claims to have been instrumental in establishing the following protected areas.
Belair National Park in 1891, 
Flinders Chase (now part of the Flinders Chase National Park) on Kangaroo Island in 1919
Ferries McDonald Conservation Park 
Spring Gully Conservation Park
Clements Gap Conservation Park
Piccaninnie Ponds Conservation Park
Monarto Conservation Park
Deep Creek Conservation Park
Black Hill Conservation Park
Cox Scrub Conservation Park
Mount Taylor Conservation Park
Nixon-Skinner Conservation Park at Myponga
Kaiser Stuhl Conservation Park
Charleston Conservation Park
Para Wirra Recreation Park

Properties owned by the Society
The Society owns a number of Nature Reserves, covered by Heritage Agreements:
Manning Reserve, 45 ha of dense natural vegetation near McLaren Vale: 
Forest Range Reserve, 15 ha of sclerophyll woodland of the higher Mount Lofty Ranges; 
Nicholls reserve, 58 ha of coastal scrub at Carpenter Rocks in the South East; 
Tookayerta Marsh, a section of natural swamp near Nangkita.

Publications
The South Australian Naturalist : the journal of the field naturalists' section of the Royal society of South Australia.

References

External links 
Field Naturalists Society

Organisations based in Adelaide
Clubs and societies in South Australia
1883 establishments in Australia
Nature conservation organisations based in Australia